Moritz Malcharek (born 29 July 1997) is a German road and track cyclist, who currently rides for UCI Continental team . Representing Germany at international competitions, Malcharek competed at the 2016 UEC European Track Championships in the scratch event.

Major results

Track

2018
 2018–19 UCI World Cup
1st Points race, Saint-Quentin-en-Yvelines
 2nd  Omnium, UEC European Under-23 Championships
2019
 UEC European Under-23 Championships
1st  Scratch
3rd  Omnium
2021
 UCI Nations Cup, Hong Kong
1st Madison (with Theo Reinhardt)
2nd Scratch
3rd Elimination
2022
 2nd  Scratch, UEC European Championships
 UCI Champions League
2nd Scratch, London

Road
2014
 1st Stage 3 (TTT) 
2016
 1st Stage 5 
2019
 2nd Overall Tour of America's Dairyland
1st Stages 1, 9 & 11

References

External links

1997 births
Living people
German male cyclists
German track cyclists
Place of birth missing (living people)
Cyclists from Berlin